The sailfin corydoras (Scleromystax macropterus), bigfin corydoras, or largefin corydoras is a subtropical freshwater fish belonging to the Corydoradinae sub-family of the family Callichthyidae.  It originates in coastal rivers in South America, and is found from São Paulo to Santa Catarina, Brazil and some upper Paraná River tributaries.  It was originally described, under the name Corydoras macropterus, by C. Tate Regan in 1913.

The fish will grow in length up to 3.4 inches (8.7 centimeters).  It lives in a subtropical climate in water with a 6.0 – 8.0 pH, a water hardness of 2 – 25 dGH, and a temperature range of 64 – 70 °F (18 – 21 °C).  It feeds on worms, benthic crustaceans, insects, and plant matter.  It lays eggs in dense vegetation and adults do not guard the eggs.

The sailfin corydoras is of commercial importance in the aquarium trade industry.

See also
 List of freshwater aquarium fish species

References 
  
 Planet Catfish – Scleromystax macropterus (Synonym) with pictures

Callichthyidae
Fish of South America
Fish of Brazil
Taxa named by Charles Tate Regan
Fish described in 1913